The Flag of Kent is the flag of the English county of Kent.  It features the white horse of Kent on a red background, a theme used in several other Kent related coats of arms and logos or symbols. It is sometimes referred to as the Invicta Flag or Invicta Flag of Kent, after the motto of Kent, Invicta.

The Flag Institute note, in the flag's entry on the UK Flags Register, that:

This is the traditional flag of Kent, supposedly based on that of Horsa, the Jute. Horsa was the brother of Hengest, who founded the Kingdom of Kent in 449. The first recorded reference is in 1605.

The flag is an adaptation of the traditional arms of Kent, to which the quote refers. These arms were attributed anachronistically to the Kingdom of Kent, but used by the Justices of Kent for many years. The arms were officially granted to Kent County Council on 17 October 1933 (and re-confirmed to its successor in 1975). The flag was accepted by the Flag Institute as that of the historic county on the basis of its traditional use.

See also
 List of flags of the United Kingdom
 List of English flags
 Twente

References

Flag
Kent
1605 introductions
Red and white flags
Kent
Flags introduced in 1933